Rainbow Dome Musick is the fifth studio album by Steve Hillage, originally released in 1979. It is a departure from his previous albums, consisting of two long ambient songs recorded in collaboration with his long-time partner Miquette Giraudy.

Background and recording
The album was commissioned for performance at the 1979 Mind-Body-Spirit Festival, held at Olympia London. It was recorded at Om in January 1979.

The equipment engineer was John Newsham. The Rainbow Dome concept was created by Rupert Atwill.

Reception

In his book The Music's All that Matters: A History of Progressive Rock, Paul Stump commented that "it was perhaps Hillage's most spiritually saturated work, 1979's Rainbow Dome Musick, which ensured his place in rock history some ten years after the event. ... its celestial, looping synthesizers and glissando guitar provided as hypnotic and mesmerizing a multi-track experience as any heard in Progressive, or indeed in rock at that point." A retrospective review by Mike DeGagne in Allmusic asserted that the album puts Hillage's varied musical background to strong use in both of the pieces, creating "a relaxing and pleasantly divergent journey through a sorted spectrum of instruments".

It was ranked as one of the 1,000 greatest albums of all time by The Guardian.

Track listing

Personnel
 Steve Hillage – lead guitar, electric guitar, glissando guitar, Fender Rhodes, ARP synthesizer, Moog synthesizer
 Miquette Giraudy – double sequencer, Fender Rhodes, ARP Omni, Tibetan bells
 Rupert Atwill – Eventide Harmoniser

References

External links
 Rainbow Dome Musick at discogs.com

Steve Hillage albums
1979 albums
Albums produced by Steve Hillage
Virgin Records albums